The Subaru Legacy (BN/BS) is the sixth generation of the Legacy range of mid-size cars.

Summary
The sixth generation of the Subaru Legacy made its debut at the 2014 Chicago Auto Show, and went into production for the 2015 model year. The Legacy Touring wagon was dropped from the lineup worldwide only having the Outback as its wagon counterpart, especially in its home market in Japan.

Engines and drivetrain
A 2.5-liter flat-four FB25 and a 3.6-liter flat-six  EZ36D are carried over from the fifth-generation model. The six-cylinder model remains unchanged from the  3.6 litre engine.

The Legacy still offers standard all-wheel drive and horizontally-opposed engine layouts, but discontinues the manual transmission for the US market in favor of the Lineartronic CVT on both engine configurations. The Canadian market offered the manual transmission for the 2.5i and 2.5i Touring trim levels until 2017.

EyeSight
EyeSight is Subaru's active safety system. When turned on, it monitors the road through windshield-mounted cameras, and can react to driving conditions and possible collisions, even before the driver can. Models equipped with EyeSight earned the highest possible rating in the IIHS front crash safety test.

The Adaptive Cruise Control function senses the speed and pace of vehicles ahead of the vehicle, and can automatically adjust the cruise control accordingly. Pre-Collision Braking uses the cameras to monitor the activity of the vehicles in front of the vehicle, and alerts the driver visually and audibly. It can also apply the brakes, if the driver hasn't done so already. According to Subaru, EyeSight also monitors the vehicle's space in its lane. It will alert the driver if the vehicle has accidentally swayed too far to either side of the lane.

All of these features are available on the 2.5i Premium, 2.5i Limited, and 3.6R Limited models.

Features and amenities
The Subaru Legacy comes in 5 trim levels: the base 2.5i, 2.5i Premium, 2.5i Sport, 2.5i Limited, and 3.6R Limited.
Below the detail is US model.

 Base 2.5i
 Comes with Halogen projector low-beam headlamps with Halogen multireflector high-beams, fog lights, Subaru's PIN Code Access system, a manual climate-control system (with air conditioning), Subaru STARLINK infotainment, a 6.2 inch high-resolution touchscreen, a 4-speaker sound system, HD Radio AM/FM radio, a rear-view camera, Symmetrical AWD, a 6-way manually adjustable driver's seat, and a 4 way manually adjustable passenger seat.
 The only option for this trim is the Partial Zero Emissions Certification package.
 2.5i Premium
 Comes with all the aforementioned equipment of the base 2.5i, plus a dual-zone climate-control system, a larger 7 inch high-resolution touchscreen, voice commands for most functions (including for the climate-control, phone, and audio functions), Satellite Radio, an upgraded 6-speaker sound system, tri-level heated front seats, a leather wrapped steering wheel & shift lever, and an 8-way power adjustable driver's seat.

 Options for the 2.5i Premium are a moonroof, a Blind Spot Detection system with Lane Change Assist & Cross Traffic Alert, a Voice-Activated GPS navigation system, and the EyeSight camera-based safety system. The EyeSight camera based safety system option also includes Steering Responsive Fog Lights, which is a cheaper alternative to having adaptive headlamps.
 2.5i Sport
 A new trim available with the 2017 model year, this trim comes with almost all of the standard features on the 2.5i Premium, but it has 18-inch aluminum alloy wheels, push-button start with keyless entry, a power moonroof, and a spoiler.
 2.5i Limited
 Further adds Leather upholstery, dual-level heated rear seats, a 12-speaker Harman Kardon sound system, matte faux-wood trim, dual USB ports in the center storage area, a Blind Spot Detection system with Lane Change Assist & Cross Traffic Alert, and two-position memory for the Driver's seat. The option for push-button start with passive-keyless entry becomes available at this trim level. (HID low-beam in 2017 models)
 The 3.6R Limited trim is comparably equipped to the 2.5i Limited trim.
  With the addition of the 3.6 liter H-6, it has a high-torque CVT, and HID (Xenon) low-beam headlamps with Halogen multireflector high-beams.
 Options for the 3.6R Limited trim are the same as the 2.5i Limited trim.

Markets

North American models

Japanese models 

This is the last Legacy model sold here. The exterior body panels are now shared internationally, as opposed to the North American version having a slightly different grille and hood for the previous generation.

Southeast Asian models 
Model available as of December 2, 2014, the sixth generation Subaru Legacy was officially launched in Southeast Asian region. The sixth generation Legacy debuted in the 2015 Manila International Auto Show in the Philippines.

European models

There is one engine, a 2.5i and SE and SE Premium trim levels.

South African models 
The Subaru Legacy is available in South Africa with the 3.6l engine only. There is only one derivative, the 3.6R-S ES Premium.

Middle East model

Australian model

Due to the lack of right-hand-drive 7th generation Legacy production in Japan, the sixth generation was the final generation sold in Australia, with 31 sixth generation Liberty's offered up as the "Subaru Liberty Final Edition". These featured various upgrades including STi wheel and body components, unique numbering, upgraded infotainment system, black exterior highlights instead of chrome, and blue and black stitching instead of the usual colours. It was offered only in three colours - Magnetite Grey (15 units), Crystal Black (10 units) and Crystal White (6 units).

Outback

North American models

Japanese models

Southeast Asian models
Model available as of December 2, 2014, the fifth generation Subaru Outback was officially launched in Southeast Asian region. The fifth generation Outback debuted in the 2015 Manila International Auto Show in the Philippines. Motor Image Group, the distributor of Subaru automobiles in Southeast Asia, releases the four-cylinder variant of the Outback.

European models

United Kingdom models

South African models
The Subaru Outback is available in South Africa in two derivatives, the lower 2.5i-s ES and the 3.6R-S ES as the flagship. The car does not make use of the new FB25 but rather the old N/A EJ25. All derivatives are equipped with the Subaru Eyesight System.

Australian models

Specifications

Chassis types

Engines

Transmissions

Models with Lineartronic Continuously variable transmission include steering column mounted paddle shifters that allows the driver to select 6 "virtual gears" in manual mode.

References

External links
Japan Subaru Legacy pages: B4, Outback
Subaru Liberty Official Page (Subaru Australia)
Subaru Outback Official Page (Subaru Australia)
Subaru global pages: Legacy MY2015

Legacy (6th generation)
Cars introduced in 2014
Vehicles with CVT transmission
Cars powered by boxer engines